The Pembina Valley  is an informal geographic region of the Canadian province of Manitoba. It is named for its major geographical feature, the Pembina Valley, which runs through the southwestern part of the region.

The Pembina Valley had a population of 67,028 as of the Canada 2021 Census (Manitoba Census Areas 3 and 4). Its major service centres are the city of Winkler and the city of  Morden. Other important towns include Altona and Carman.

The major industries of the Pembina Valley are agriculture and manufacturing.

The region is also now home to Pembina Valley Provincial Park.

Major communities
 Altona
 Carman
 Cartwright
 Crystal City
 Emerson
 Gretna
 Manitou Morden
 Morris
 Pilot Mound
 Plum Coulee
 Roland
 Somerset
 Winkler

References
Community Profile: Census Division No. 3, Manitoba; Statistics Canada
Community Profile: Census Division No. 4, Manitoba; Statistics Canada

External links
Manitoba Regional Profiles: Pembina Valley Region
Central Manitoba Tourism

 
Geographic regions of Manitoba